"The Big Killing" is a 1965 Australian television film which aired on ABC. A murder drama aired in a 70-minute time-slot, it was produced in ABC's Sydney studios. Producer was James Upshaw, whose previous works had included variety series The Lorrae Desmond Show.

It aired as part of Wednesday Theatre. Australian TV drama was relatively rare at the time.

A search of their website shows that the National Archives of Australia hold a copy of this program, with running time listing as 1:14:31.

Plot
Peter Ashbury is a young man who lives on Palm Beach, Sydney, with an expensive wife Mary and house he cannot afford. Their neighbours and close friends are Liz and Charles Barcher. He makes a £25,000 bet to murder Liz, the wife of the wealthy Charles. When the wife dies, blame attaches to Peter and then to his wife Mary.

Cast
Roger Climpson as Peter Ashbury
June Thody  as Mary Ashbury
Nigel Lovell as Charles Barcher
Benita Harvey as Liz Barcher
Ron Haddrick as an honest neighbour Gavin Cole
Stewart Ginn as Inspector Fowler
Betty Dyson as Norah
Tommy Dysart as Sgt Basset

Production
It was based on a West End stage play. Ian McKellen appeared in a 1962 production and called it "Another miserably- written "comedy thriller", which made the cast laugh more than the audience and which thrilled no-one."

The ABC bought the rights and it was adapted to be set in Australia.

The play marked a return to acting by Roger Climpson after an eight-year absence, during which time he had established himself as a newsreader. He had left Channel Nine 18 months previously and been making documentaries since.

Reception
The Canberra Times called the script "two steps backward" and said that "unfortunately the producer James Upshaw who is capable of better, much better things, seemed to have taken his cue from the script rather than the high-powered talent he wastefully cast".

The Sydney Morning Herald said it "made good television viewing."

Another critic for the same paper said it was "like a burst of fireworks... brilliantly acted... must surely rate as THE play so far this year" adding writer Mackie "threw in more angles and red herrings than a Perry Mason episode" and "managed to keep the plot going at a rattling pace until its last moments."

See also
 List of live television plays broadcast on Australian Broadcasting Corporation (1950s)

References

External links
 

1965 television plays
1965 Australian television episodes
1960s Australian television plays
Black-and-white television episodes
Wednesday Theatre (season 1) episodes